Northford Ice Pavilion is an American ice skating complex, located in the Northford area of North Branford, Connecticut. It hosts a number of high school ice hockey teams.

The arena formerly hosted the Connecticut Whale of the Premier Hockey Federation in the 2016–17 season.  It also formerly hosted the NCAA Division I program of Quinnipiac Bobcats men's ice hockey, in the era before the TD Banknorth Sports Center was opened.

References

Defunct college ice hockey venues in the United States
Indoor ice hockey venues in the United States
Sports venues in New Haven County, Connecticut
 
North Branford, Connecticut
1999 establishments in Connecticut
Sports venues completed in 1999
College ice hockey venues in the United States